Giorgos Tsipras (b. 1968, Athens) is a Syriza politician.

He graduated from the Varvakeio High School and holds a degree in Mechanical Engineering from the National Technical University of Athens.

He is a cousin of former Syriza prime minister Alexis Tsipras, which has led to accusations of nepotism from political opponents.

References

External links
Official website 

Syriza politicians
1968 births
Living people
Politicians from Athens
National Technical University of Athens alumni
Greek MPs 2019–2023
21st-century Greek politicians